Nathot is a village in Punjab, Pakistan. It is situated about 68 km from Jhelum and near Chakwal border. It has a population of approximately 3200.

The language spoken in the village is Punjabi. Most people make a living from farming, cattle, and particularly from growing wheat. However number of People working abroad specially Middle east has increased in last few years. The army is second most favourite job for residents. Almost every family has at least one person serving in Army.

According to legend, the village was started when a young man from Nakka Khalaspur was in search of his lost camels. During his stay near Old Graveyard met with an old man from Padhrala (a nearby village) who was beaten by Sikhs for unknown reason. The young man helped Old man and saved him from Sikhs.

The old man then thanked him and asked him the reason for his visit to the area. The young man told him that he is searching for his camels. The old man who knows the area very well helped him to find his camels. This was the start of relation and further visits to each other. The young man then married the daughter of the old man and build their first home in the centre of the village exactly near the grand mosque. He is considered as the first resident or foundation layer of the village.

There are many notable person from Nathot.Muhammad Saqlain Hameed Awan MALIK MUHAMMAD HUSSAIN , MALIK NASIR AWAN , MALIK HAJI ASHRAF , MALIK SUBIDAR DEWAN MUHAMMAD KHAN , MALIK HAMZA NASIR AWAN AND BABA FATAH MAHDI KHAN
 Ghulam Raziq 
 was one of them.

References

Villages in Jhelum District